The following individuals have been identified as senior officers (currently or in the past) of the Islamic Republic of Iran Army (AJA), which is a branch of the Iranian Armed Forces.

Chiefs of the Joint Staff

|-
! colspan="8" align="center" | Imperial Iranian Armed Forces

|-
! colspan="8" align="center" | Islamic Republic of Iran Army

Commanders-in-Chief

Commanders of military branches

Ground Forces

Air Force

Air Defense Force

Navy

See also
 List of commanders of the Islamic Revolutionary Guard Corps

References

External links

Islamic Republic of Iran Army